Theo Uittenbogaard (born Amstelveen, Nieuwer-Amstel, Netherlands, 1946 – 2022) was a Dutch radio & TV-producer, who worked for almost all nationwide public networks in The Netherlands since 1965. His training was on-the-job, since no school or academy geared to that profession existed in The Netherlands those days. He started as a 19-year-old apprentice reporter for a daily radio news-show. Made radio-documentaries and variety-shows. In 1969 he was invited to contribute to a television-magazine, which portrayed interesting ordinary people. He remained working for television the next decades. In a wide variety and range of shows, as a director, as a contributor, as an editor, as an executive-producer alternately. He traveled the world from Siberia [] to The Marshall Islands to report, from Panama and Morocco[] to just around the corner. He did shows and documentaries on countries, people, history, politics, dance, music. In 1984 he directed for VPRO-tv an iconic concerto by Ástor Piazzolla, [] the renowned bandoneon-player from Argentina. He did a documentary on Boat People from Vietnam. He made a 16-episodes series on Dutch language. He wrote a comedy on housekeeping. And about 250 productions more. He retired in 2013, after a fifty years spanning career in media.

References

External links

Biography at media-archives Beeld en Geluid, Hiversum, Netherlands
Oeuvre at Beeld en Geluid
YouTube Channel

People from Amstelveen
Dutch television producers
Living people
1946 births